Pontpierre is a small town in the commune of Mondercange, in south-western Luxembourg.  , it has a population of 1,017 inhabitants.

References

Mondercange
Towns in Luxembourg